Robert Quinn (born May 18, 1990) is an American football defensive end who is a free agent. He played college football at North Carolina, and was drafted by the St. Louis Rams with the 14th pick in the first round of the 2011 NFL Draft.

High school career
Quinn attended Fort Dorchester High School in North Charleston, South Carolina, where he played for the Fort Dorchester Patriots high school football team. As a senior, his season was shortened after undergoing brain surgery for a benign tumor. Quinn made a full recovery and was able to resume his football career. He registered 54 tackles, 10 tackles for loss, five sacks, and 21 quarterback hurries before the surgery. He was ranked the 19th best defensive end recruit by Scout.com and the 18th by Rivals.com He was also a 3-time heavyweight state champ in 4A wrestling. He also played in the 2008 U.S. Army All-American Bowl.

College career
Quinn attended the University of North Carolina at Chapel Hill, where he played for the North Carolina Tar Heels football team.  As a freshman in 2008, Quinn started 12 of 13 games, recording 34 tackles (6.5 for losses) and two quarterback sacks and forced two fumbles. He was also named the ACC's Brian Piccolo Award winner as the league's most courageous player and finished third in the voting for the ACC Defensive Rookie of the Year honors.

As a sophomore in 2009, Quinn had 52 tackles and led the ACC and was 15th in the country in tackles for losses with 19.0 and was second in the league and 16th in the nation in sacks with 11.0 sacks. Additionally, he had three pass breakups and was second in the ACC and fourth in the country with six forced fumbles. For his efforts, he was a First-team All-ACC selection and was a Second-team All-American by CBS. He also finished second in the ACC Defensive Player of the Year voting.

As a junior in 2010, Quinn missed the season after he was ruled ineligible by the NCAA for lying to investigators about receiving travel accommodations and jewelry.

On November 19, 2013, the University of North Carolina sent a permanent disassociation letter to Quinn, Marvin Austin, and Greg Little for the improper benefits taken during their time at the university. The three athletes are prohibited from contacting current North Carolina athletes and are not allowed inside the Kenan Football Center or other athletic facilities on campus.

College statistics

Professional career
Already in April 2010, Quinn was regarded as one of the top prospects for the 2011 NFL Draft. Despite sitting out all of his junior season, he was still projected to be a top-10 selection in January 2011. His stock slightly dropped after the combine, projecting him at No. 11 in early March.

St. Louis / Los Angeles Rams
The St. Louis Rams selected Quinn in the first round (14th overall) of the 2011 NFL Draft. Quinn was the second defensive end drafted in 2011 after J. J. Watt (11th overall).

2011 season
On July 30, 2011, the St. Louis Rams signed Quinn to a fully guaranteed four-year, $9.43 million contract that includes a signing bonus of $4.77 million. Quinn arrived a day late to practice due to the birth of his first son. Throughout training camp, Quinn competed to be a starting defensive end against long time veteran James Hall. Head coach Steve Spagnuolo named Quinn the primary backup defensive end to start the season, behind veterans Chris Long and James Hall.

He made his professional regular season debut in the St. Louis Rams’ Week 2 game at the New York Giants and made two solo tackles and recorded his first career sack as the Rams lost 28-16 on Monday Night Football. Quinn made his first career sack on Giants’ quarterback Eli Manning for an eight-yard loss during the third quarter. On October 30, 2011, he recorded his second sack and blocked a punt against the New Orleans Saints, earning the NFC Special Teams Player of the Week Award for his effort. In Week 11, Quinn made a season-high five solo tackles and had one sack during a 24-7 loss against the Seattle Seahawks. On December 18, 2011, Quinn earned his first career start after James Hall sustained a knee injury. He recorded one tackle and a pass deflection as the Rams lost 20-13 against the Cincinnati Bengals. Quinn completed his rookie season with 23 combined tackles (20 solo), five sacks, three blocked punts, two pass deflections, and a forced fumble in 16 games and one start.

2012 season
On January 2, 2012, the St. Louis Rams fired head coach Steve Spagnuolo after they completed the season with a 4-12 record. On January 13, 2012, the St. Louis Rams hired former Tennessee Titans head coach Jeff Fisher. Head coach Jeff Fisher named Quinn and Chris Long the starting defensive ends to begin the regular season. On October 4, 2012, Quinn recorded six combined tackles (four solo) and a season-high three sacks on Kevin Kolb during a 17-3 win against the Arizona Cardinals. He finished the 2012 NFL season with 29 combined tackles (24 solo) and 10.5 sacks in 16 games and 14 starts.

2013 season
In Week 1 of the 2013 season against the Arizona Cardinals, Quinn tied his career high for sacks in a game with three, causing two fumbles and was also held once by Cardinal left tackle Levi Brown in a 27–24 Rams win in St. Louis. He was named the NFC Defensive Player of the Week on September 11, 2013. In Week 12, against the Chicago Bears, Quinn forced a fumble that was recovered for a touchdown by Chris Long. In Week 16, Quinn recorded three sacks against the Tampa Bay Buccaneers, passing Kevin Carter for the most sacks in a single season by a Ram with 18. Quinn finished with 19 sacks, 57 total tackles, one pass defended, seven forced fumbles, and two fumble recoveries. Quinn was awarded the 2013 PFWA Defensive Player of the Year award; in addition to being a consensus First-team All-Pro. He was ranked 13th by his fellow players on the NFL Top 100 Players of 2014.

2014 season
On September 13, 2014, Quinn signed a six-year extension with the Rams through the 2019 season. In the 2014 season, he recorded 10.5 sacks, 46 total tackles, six passes defended, and five forced fumbles. He earned a Pro Bowl nomination for the second consecutive year. He was ranked 44th by his fellow players on the NFL Top 100 Players of 2015.

2015 season
Quinn started out the 2015 season with two sacks in a 34–31 overtime victory over the Seattle Seahawks in Week 1. Due to injury, he appeared in eight games and finished with five sacks, 21 total tackles, three passes defensed, and three forced fumbles.

2016 season
On December 15, 2016, Quinn was placed on injured reserve with a concussion. In the 2016 season, he appeared in nine games and had four sacks, ten total tackles, two passes defended, and two forced fumbles.

2017 season
In the 2017 season, Quinn finished with 8.5 sacks, 32 total tackles (21 solo), one pass defensed, and two forced fumbles in 15 games.

Miami Dolphins
On March 14, 2018, Quinn was traded to the Miami Dolphins in exchange for a 2018 fourth-round draft pick (Brian Allen was selected with the pick) and a swap of sixth-round picks. He started all 16 games, finishing with a team-leading 6.5 sacks, along with 38 combined tackles and two forced fumbles.

Dallas Cowboys

On March 28, 2019, Quinn was traded to the Dallas Cowboys in exchange for a 2020 sixth-round pick (#197-John Penisini). Because the jersey number 94 was taken by Randy Gregory, Quinn changed to jersey number 58 for the Cowboys. On August 6, he fractured his left hand during a training camp practice. On August 8, the league announced that Quinn was suspended the first two games of the 2019 season for a violation of the league’s policy on performance-enhancing substances, which he stated was related to his anti-seizure medication. He was reinstated from suspension on September 16 and was named the starter at right defensive end.

In week 4 against the New Orleans Saints, Quinn sacked Teddy Bridgewater twice in the 12-10 loss. In week 6 against the New York Jets, Quinn sacked Sam Darnold twice in the 24-22 loss. In week 7 against the Philadelphia Eagles, Quinn recorded a sack on Carson Wentz before leaving the game with a rib injury.  Without Quinn, the Cowboys won 37-10. He finished the season with 25 tackles, 11.5 sacks (led the team), 37 quarterback pressures, three passes defensed and two forced fumbles.

Chicago Bears
On April 1, 2020, Quinn signed a five-year, $70 million contract with the Chicago Bears.

Quinn switched back to jersey number 94 with the Bears. He made his debut with the Bears in Week 2 against the New York Giants.  Quinn missed the previous week's game due to an ankle injury.  During the game, Quinn recorded his first sack as a Bear on Daniel Jones in the 17–13 win.  Quinn's sack forced Jones to fumble the football which was recovered by teammate Khalil Mack. In Week 7 against his former team, the Los Angeles Rams, on Monday Night Football, Quinn forced a fumble on former teammate Robert Woods which was returned for a touchdown by Eddie Jackson during the 24–10 loss.

The following season, on November 9, 2021, Quinn recorded a career high 3 1/2 sacks in a 16–14 loss against the Baltimore Ravens. On December 2, Quinn was named NFC Defensive Player of the month for November. He was the first player to win the award for the Bears since Eddie Jackson in 2018.

On December 20, Quinn was selected to his third Pro Bowl. Quinn finished the season with 18.5 sacks, just short of his career best of 19 he set back in 2013. Quinn was named second-team All-Pro by the Associated Press. He was ranked 48th by his fellow players on the NFL Top 100 Players of 2022.

Philadelphia Eagles

Quinn was traded to the Philadelphia Eagles in exchange for a fourth round selection in the 2023 NFL Draft on October 26, 2022. He was placed on injured reserve on December 6, 2022. He was activated on January 7, 2023. Quinn reached Super Bowl LVII but the Eagles lost 38-35 to the Kansas City Chiefs.

NFL career statistics

Regular season

Personal life
Quinn's mother is from Puerto Rico. Quinn is the brother of Olympic gold medalist Puerto Rican hurdler Jasmine Camacho-Quinn.

References

External links

 Philadelphia Eagles bio
 North Carolina Tar Heels bio

1990 births
Living people
American football linebackers
American football defensive ends
People from Berkeley County, South Carolina
Players of American football from South Carolina
North Carolina Tar Heels football players
St. Louis Rams players
Los Angeles Rams players
Miami Dolphins players
Dallas Cowboys players
Chicago Bears players
Philadelphia Eagles players
Unconferenced Pro Bowl players
American sportspeople of Puerto Rican descent
100 Sacks Club
National Conference Pro Bowl players
Brian Piccolo Award winners